Oyster Bay (also spelled Oysterbay), also known as Cocoa Beach and Coco Beach, is an affluent neighbourhood in Dar es Salaam, Tanzania. It is popularly known for its attractive beach. Oyster Bay is located north west of Dar es Salaam's central business district along the Indian Ocean. Europeans have resided here since colonial times. Since independence, Europeans working for development aid organizations, and senior government officials, including ministers, permanent secretaries, directors and commissioners, reside here.

The area is bounded by the Indian Ocean on the east, Mawenzi Road on the North, Ali Hassan Mwinyi Road to the south, and Ali bin Said Road to the West. Some local institutions are named Oysterbay, including a police station, a hospital and a school.

Food
Oyster Bay is popular for the food sold there, such as Muhogo (cassava),  Mishkaki (Grilled meat skewers) and Madafu (Coconut water) sold by traders. Some new restaurants have also been constructed including M Burger.

Expansion and Renovation
In 2015, it was reported that there are plans of developing the cocoa beach, which will continue to remain a free open space for public. The main reasons for this plan is to keep it clean, to boost tourism and employment, and to further improve security in the area. Cocoa Beach is being renovated at the cost of TSh 11.6 billion. As of September 2019, transformation of the beach has been started. As of January 2022, renovation is going at a good pace, with many food stalls being constructed to give the beach a beautiful look.

Economics

Retail
Oysterbay Shopping Centre is located in the centre of the neighbourhood, along with several other businesses.

Art galleries
The founder of the popular Tingatinga painting style, Edward Tingatinga, began his artistic career while in Oyster Bay. The Tanzanian Tingatinga Art Gallery is located here.

Embassies hosted in Oyster Bay
The following 11 embassies are hosted in and near the Oyster Bay area;
The Embassy of the People's Republic of China 
The Republic of the Republic of Turkey
The Embassy of the Federative Republic of Brazil
The Embassy of Ireland
The Embassy of the Kingdom of Saudi Arabia
The Embassy of the Republic of Namibia
The Embassy of the Republic of Angola
The Embassy of the Republic of Rwanda
The Embassy of the Republic of Kenya
The Embassy of the French Republic
The Embassy of the Russian Federation

References

External link

Geography of Dar es Salaam
Beaches of Tanzania